The Wordos is a writing workshop based in Eugene, Oregon, United States. Its members meet once a week to critique stories and discuss the art, craft, and business of writing. It is a long-running speculative fiction critique group, and has a high concentration of published authors. However, having prior publishing credits is not a prerequisite to joining. The group has produced winners of the Galaxy Press international Writers of the Future contest six years in a row. 

The group promotes itself as a means to help writers produce fiction of salable quality, and to continually improve their writing abilities. The workshop's primary focus is on short speculative fiction, but members have had fiction of other lengths and genres critiqued.

History
Founded in 1987, "The Wordos" was originally called "The Eugene Professional Writers Workshops, Inc." The name was changed in 1995, to make it "shorter and friendlier." They kept the original name for business purposes, however. The group meets weekly in a local bookstore.

Notable members
The membership over time has included, young adult and fantasy novelist Nina Kiriki Hoffman, surrealist short story writer and novelist Ray Vukcevich, science fiction writers Kathy Oltion and Jerry Oltion, Bruce Holland Rogers, Patricia Briggs, fiction and non-fiction writer Leslie What, Jay Lake, Eric M. Witchey, Devon Monk and many others. Deborah Layne, a long-time member, is also the founder of Wheatland Press, the award-winning publisher of the Polyphony anthology.

Method
The Wordos follow the Clarion Workshop model of critiquing. A member reads a submitted story, writes comments on it, and then, on the evening of the workshop, speaks for one to three minutes offering those and other comments aloud. At the end of the evening the critiqued story is given back to the author.

Members also report on news over the previous week, including accepted stories, rejections, and re-write requests from publishers.

Awards
A member of the Wordos has won or placed in the L. Ron Hubbard Writers of the Future contest consistently since 2001. There have also been several Nebula Award-winning workshop members and members who have been nominated for or won the Endeavour Award, World Fantasy Award, and Philip K. Dick Award. One member, Marshall Moseley, was a finalist in the Bravo television series "Project Greenlight".

Partial list of award-winning stories

The following is a partial list of award-winning stories written by members of the Wordos:

References

External links
 Wordos (official website)
 http://www.sff.net/people/j.oltion Jerry Oltion's SFF.net profile
 Eugene Weekly newspaper profile of Nina Kiriki Hoffman
 Register-Guard newspaper profile of Marshall Moseley
 Register-Guard newspaper profile of the Wordos
 KVAL CBS 13  interview with Damon Kaswell and John Burridge

Speculative fiction writing circles
Writing circles
Culture of Eugene, Oregon
Creative writing programs
1987 establishments in Oregon